The Academy of Canadian Cinema and Television presents an annual award for Best Feature Length Documentary. First presented in 1968 as part of the Canadian Film Awards, it became part of the Genie Awards in 1980 and the contemporary Canadian Screen Awards in 2013.

1960s

1970s

1980s

1990s

2000s

2010s

2020s

See also
Prix Iris for Best Documentary Film

References

Canadian documentary film awards
Feature documentary